Kryptopterus cryptopterus (blue sheatfish) is a species of catfish, the type species of the genus Kryptopterus. It can be distinguished from all its congeners, with the exception of the newly split Kryptopterus geminus, by the almost flat dorsal profile with no concavity behind the head.  This species grows to a length of  SL.

This distinctively shaped, translucent fish is found in Peninsular Malaysia, Borneo and Sumatra. Specimens from Cambodia, Laos, Thailand and Vietnam previously assigned to this species are now recognized as a separate species, K. geminus. K. cryptopterus can be distinguished from this close relative by its broader head, shorter snout, shorter anal fin and eyes located much more ventrally.

As food
In Thailand it is one of the catfish species known in the markets as Pla Nuea On (ปลาเนื้ออ่อน), highly valued as food in the local cuisine for its delicate flesh. This fish is also often used for making fish balls.

See also
List of Thai ingredients

References

External links
 Bangkok Post - All fished out

Siluridae
Fish of Asia
Freshwater fish of Indonesia
Freshwater fish of Malaysia
Fish of Thailand
Fish described in 1851
IUCN Red List least concern species